Copeville may refer to:

Copeville, Texas,  an unincorporated community in the United States
Copeville, South Australia,  a town